Damascus is home to many Mosques, each drawing from various periods of its history such as the Umayyad Caliphate (of which Damascus was the seat), Abbasid Caliphate, Fatimids, Ayyubids, Mamluks, Ottoman Empire and finally the modern Syrian Arab Republic.

Umayyads
Umayyad Mosque

Fatimids
Nur al-Din Madrasa

Ayyubids
Al-Tuba Mosque
Hanabila Mosque

Mamluks
Yalbugha Mosque
Aqsab Mosque
Mosque of Senjeqdar
Tabtabeya Mosque
Saboneya Mosque
Hanging mosque

Tawawsiya mosque
Siyaneya Complex
Sheikh Raslan Mosque
Al-Saqeeqa Mosque
Mosque of Asim
Mosque of Ward
Mosque of Zein
Mosque of Qola'e
Tetkez Mosque
Mosque of Toreezi

Ottomans

Darwish Pasha Mosque
Sinan Pasha Mosque
Salimiyya Takiyya Mosque
Sulaymaniyya Takiyya Mosque
Nabi Habeel Mosque
Al-Arish Mosque

Modern
Sayyidah Zaynab Mosque
Sayyidah Ruqayya Mosque

External links
http://www.syriatourism.org/index.php?module=subjects&func=viewpage&pageid=1925

List|Mosques
Damascus
Mosques, Damascus